Winter in the Blood is a 2013 American film written and directed by brothers Alex Smith and Andrew J. Smith and produced by Native American author Sherman Alexie. The film was based on the debut novel Winter in the Blood (1974) by noted author James Welch, who was a leader of the Native American renaissance in literature.

Plot
The film is set in Montana. In what has been called "a tale of simple, raw struggle and survival among a small-town Native American community", Virgil First Raise, a Native American, returns home after waking drunk in a ditch to find that his wife, Agnes, has left him. He sets out on an odyssey to find her.

Cast
 Chaske Spencer as Virgil First Raise
 David Morse as Airplane man
 Gary Farmer as Lame Bull
 Julia Jones as Agnes First Raise
 Dana Wheeler-Nicholson as Malvina
 Lily Gladstone as Heather
 Saginaw Grant as Yellow Calf
 Michael Spears as Raymond Long Knife
 David Cale as Bad Suit

Reception
Mark Olsen of the Los Angeles Times said the film is concerned with memory and regret and it "feels boldly unburdened by many of the rules of structure and conventional storytelling." It has moments that are "unexpectedly arresting and little jabs of poetic meaning or hard-earned truths reel a viewer back in."

Jeannette Catsoulis of The New York Times said the film had compassion for the "wounds of childhood" and the "trap of ethnicity." She praised the work of the cinematographer Paula Huidobro, noting that she captured the expanse of the Montana plains and big sky while having "cross-fades [that] parallel the ebb and flow of Virgil’s memories and hallucinations."

The film was an Official Selection at the 2013 Los Angeles, Austin, and American Indian film festivals.

References

External links
 (Dead link)

2013 films
Films about Native Americans
Films set in Montana
Films based on American novels
2010s English-language films
American drama films
2010s American films